Eremia is a Romanian name that may refer to
Given name
Eremia Grigorescu (1863–1919), Romanian artillery general 

Surname
Alexandra Eremia (born 1987), Romanian artistic gymnast
Alina Eremia (born 1993), Romanian singer, TV personality and actress

Romanian-language surnames
Romanian masculine given names